Lycoperdon subincarnatum is a type of puffball mushroom in the genus Lycoperdon (family Agaricaceae). It was first officially described in 1872 by American mycologist Charles Horton Peck. The puffball is found in North America and China.

References

External links

Fungi described in 1872
Fungi of Asia
Fungi of North America
Taxa named by Charles Horton Peck
subincarnatum